Arthur Ernest James Somers (January 19, 1902 – January 29, 1992) was a professional ice hockey player who played 222 games in the National Hockey League. Born in Winnipeg, Manitoba, he played with the Chicago Black Hawks and New York Rangers. He won the Stanley Cup in 1933 with the New York Rangers.

As a junior ice hockey player, Sommers won the 1921 Memorial Cup with the Winnipeg Junior Falcons.

Awards and achievements
MJHL Turnbull Cup Championship (1921)
Memorial Cup Championship (1921)
PCHL Scoring Champion (1929)
PCHL Goal scoring Leader (1929)
Stanley Cup Championship (1933)
"Honoured Member" of the Manitoba Hockey Hall of Fame

External links

1902 births
1992 deaths
Canadian ice hockey centres
Chicago Blackhawks players
New York Rangers players
Ice hockey people from Winnipeg
Stanley Cup champions
Winnipeg Falcons players
Winnipeg Maroons players
Winnipeg Victorias players
Canadian expatriate ice hockey players in the United States